Ilias Tselios (born 6 October 1997) is a Greek professional footballer who plays as an attacking midfielder for Super League 2 club Chania.

Career

AEK Athens
Tselios began his career at the infrastructure segments of AEK Athens, and made his senior debut against Pannaxiakos on the last matchday of the 2013–14 Gamma Ethniki season. He played for AEK's U−20 during the club's short tenure in the Football League and eventually made his Superleague debut in 26 November 2016, as a late substitute for Patito Rodríguez in a 3−0 home win vs. Platanias. In total, Tselios made 4 appearances for the club in both the Superleague and Cup competitions.

Loan moves
At the start of the 2017–18 season, Tselios moved to fellow Superleague side Lamia on a one-year loan deal in order to get more playing time. In January 2018, Tselios returned to AEK having made no appearances for Lamia during his loan spell. He was subsequently loaned out to Football League side Ergotelis in January 2018 until the end of the season. He became instrumental in Ergotelis' Second Round push out of the relegation zone, making a total of 18 appearances, all as a starter. On 16 May 2018 he scored his first goal for the team in a 2−1 away loss against Anagennisi Karditsa. On 20 May 2018 he scored in a 5−1 home win against Aiginiakos, which cemented his team's place above the relegation zone. His performances with the club made Ergotelis officials request an extension to his loan from AEK, therefore securing Tselios' services until the end of the 2018−19 season.

Ergotelis
Having proven himself to be an invaluable asset for Ergotelis' style of play, the club's administration pushed for his acquisition via transfer from AEK. Their perseverance eventually paid off, as Tselios was released from his contract with AEK, and joined Ergotelis on a two-year deal in September 2019.

Personal life
His twin brother, Themistoklis, is also a professional footballer.

Career statistics

Honours
AEK Athens
Football League 2: 2013–14

References

External links

1997 births
Living people
Greece youth international footballers
Super League Greece players
Football League (Greece) players
Super League Greece 2 players
AEK Athens F.C. players
PAS Lamia 1964 players
Ergotelis F.C. players
Xanthi F.C. players
Volos N.F.C. players
Association football midfielders
Footballers from Athens
Greek footballers